Gilboa is a surname. Notable people with the surname include:

Amir Gilboa (1917–1984), Ukrainian-born Israeli poet
Jacob Gilboa (1920–2007), Israeli classical composer
Itzhak Gilboa (born 1963), Israeli economist
Tal Gilboa (born 1978), Israeli animal liberation and vegan activist